Sennumstad or Senumstad is a village in Birkenes municipality in Agder county, Norway. The village is located on the western shore of the river Tovdalselva at the junction of the Norwegian National Road 41 and the Norwegian County Road 406. The Senumstad Bridge crosses the river in the village.

References

Villages in Agder
Birkenes